Steel Wheels Live is a live album by the English rock band the Rolling Stones. It was broadcast live and recorded on 19 December 1989 on the Steel Wheels/Urban Jungle Tour, promoting Steel Wheels album, and was released in 2020. Flashpoint was another live album from the same tour.

It features appearances by Axl Rose and Izzy Stradlin from Guns N' Roses, Eric Clapton and John Lee Hooker.

The album was released as Blu-ray and DVD video, as well as audio-only on a double CD or four LPs or digital downloads.

Special limited six-disc deluxe version, which included the DVD, Bluray, double CD as well as DVD of Tokyo Dome (previously released only in Japan as From the Vault Extra Live in Japan Tokyo Dome 1990.2.24), and an exclusive CD of non-core song performances during the tour, called Steel Wheels Rare Reels.

Track listing 

A CD with rarely performed songs, exclusive to the special limited six-disc deluxe version.

Personnel
The Rolling Stones
 Mick Jagger – lead vocals, guitars, harmonica
 Keith Richards – vocals, guitars
 Ronnie Wood – guitars
 Bill Wyman – bass guitar
 Charlie Watts – drums

Additional personnel
 Matt Clifford – keyboards, French horn
 Chuck Leavell – keyboards,  backing vocals 
 Bobby Keys – saxophone
 Horns by The Uptown Horns – Arno Hecht, Paul Litteral, Bob Funk, Crispen Cloe
 Bernard Fowler – backing vocals
 Lisa Fischer – backing vocals
 Cindy Mizelle – backing vocals

Charts

References

2020 live albums
The Rolling Stones live albums
Events in Atlantic City, New Jersey